Patulibacter ginsengiterrae  is a Gram-positive bacterium from the genus of Patulibacter which has been isolated from soil from a ginseng field in Geumsan County in Korea.

References

 

Actinomycetota
Bacteria described in 2012